The Uganda national beach soccer team represents Uganda in international beach soccer competitions and is controlled by the FUFA, the governing body for football in Uganda. The Uganda national beach soccer team played their first game, in international friendly match, in December 2014, winning 6–5 to Zanzibar Sand Heroes Their second win came in the 2015 February 1 in the next friendly match against Kenya Sand Heroes in Mombasa, in which Uganda won against the hosts 7–6.

Current squad
Correct as of 2015

 

Coach: Kebba Haruna

Current Staff
 Head of Delegation: Abdul Hamid Juma

References

2014 establishments in Uganda
African national beach soccer teams
Beach soccer